Larry Edwards, also known by his drag persona Hot Chocolate, is an American entertainer. Known for his performances in Las Vegas, primarily as a Tina Turner female impersonator. Edwards has also competed in national pageants, being crowned as Miss Gay America in 1980.

Edwards has made numerous appearances on film and in television, including Miss Congeniality 2, What's Love Got to Do with It, the documentary Pageant, and the competition series The Next Best Thing.

Edwards studied Fashion Merchandising at Massey Business College in Atlanta, Georgia.

Edwards performed in Frank Marino's Las Vegas drag-revue show Divas as Tina Turner and previously performed in the long-running hit show La Cage at the Riviera Hotel and Casino. Edwards met Tina Turner at a taping of The Oprah Winfrey Show.

Edwards was the Celebrity Grand Marshall of the Las Vegas Pride Parade in 2010. Las Vegas mayor Oscar Goodman awarded Edwards the Keys to the city for his work in promoting the hospitality industry of the area.

In 2019, when Celine Dion announced her 2019/2020 Courage World Tour, she released a video titled "Ciao for now Las Vegas", in which she leaves Las Vegas in a car full of drag queens. Impersonator Steven Wayne stood in for Dion, alongside drag queens; Bryan Watkins, Crystal Woods and Hot Chocolate as Barbra Streisand, Diana Ross and Tina Turner.

He released a music video in 2020 featuring the remixed version of "What's Love Got to Do with It" by Kygo.

Filmography

References

External links
 

Living people
African-American drag queens
American drag queens
American gay actors
LGBT African Americans
LGBT people from Florida
LGBT people from Nevada
People from Fort Myers, Florida
Year of birth missing (living people)